Mountain Rescue Committee of Scotland (MRCofS), now known as Scottish Mountain Rescue is the body which represents and coordinates mountain rescue teams in Scotland. It has 27 affiliated mountain rescue teams.

Scottish Mountain Rescue consists of 21 volunteer mountain rescue teams, 2 search and rescue dog associations (SARDA) with over 1000 volunteers, plus an additional 3 police teams, 1 RAF team and Scottish Cave Rescue.

The Mountain Rescue Committee of Scotland (MRCofS) was formed in 1965. It is a registered charity (number SC015257).

In 2011 it received annual funding grant of £312,000 from the Scottish Government. This is distributed between the teams, with the largest grant, £24,000 going to the Lochaber MRT.

Increasingly, the organisation has seen demands for "non-mountain" rescue operations in response to events such as flooding, and searching for missing people. However, a reported split in the organisation in 2016 prompted by this was denied. Later that same year the Cairngorm, Glen Coe, Lochaber and Tayside teams left the organisation to form Independent Scottish Mountain Rescue (iSMR).

Teams

Volunteer Mountain Rescue teams
 Aberdeen MRT
 Arran MRT
 Arrochar MRT
 Assynt MRT
 Borders SAR Unit
 Braemar MRT
 Dundonnell MRT
 Galloway MRT
 Glenelg MRT
 Glenmore Lodge MRT
 Killin MRT
 Kintail MRT
 Lomond MRT
 Moffat MRT
 Hebrides MRT
 Oban MRT
 Ochils MRT
 Skye MRT
 Torridon MRT
 Tweed Valley MRT

Police teams

 Police (Grampian) MRT
 Police (Strathclyde) MRT
 Police (Tayside) MRT

RAF team

 RAF Lossiemouth MRT

Search and rescue dog associations

 SARDA (Scotland)
 SARDA (Southern Scotland)

Drone Search and Rescue 

 Search and Rescue Aerial Association - Scotland (SARAA-Scotland)

Cave rescue teams

 Scottish Cave Rescue

See also
Ben Nevis
Buachaille Etive Mòr
Mountains and hills of Scotland

References

External links
 

Fire and rescue in Scotland
Charities based in Scotland
Mountain rescue agencies
Volunteer search and rescue in the United Kingdom